Chiusa di San Michele is a comune (municipality) in the Metropolitan City of Turin in the Italian region Piedmont, located about  west of Turin.

Geography
Chiusa di San Michele borders the following municipalities: Condove, Caprie, Vaie, Sant'Ambrogio di Torino, Valgioie, and Coazze.

In the vicinity there is the monastery of Sacra di San Michele.

References

External links

 
 comuni-italiani.it wiki

Cities and towns in Piedmont